Hari Singh (1910–2003) was the Inspector General of Forests of India in the 1960s. Shri Hari Singh came from a find tradition of great Indian Foresters. Among several other awards, he was awarded the Member of the Order of the British Empire (MBE), a distinguishing honor bestowed upon him by the British Government. He held India's highest office of forest administration, namely, Inspector General of Forests, from 1964 to 1969, and graced innumberable national and international bodies on the development of the forestry sector.

He recognized the importance of forests and gave them a respectable place in the Five-Year Plans. He was instrumental in enacting the 42nd. amendment of the constitution which brought forestry into the concurrent list. In 1966 he was responsible for the creation of the Indian Forest Service to cater to the need for inter-state coordination and uniformity of approach in dealing with the scientific management of forests and the environment.  The Indian Forest Service was the third all-India service to be created, the others being the Indian Administrative Service and the Indian Police Service. Having studied forestry at the Edinburgh, he joined the Bombay Presidency as a Forest Officer and set a new direction to forest management in the state. He later served as chief conservator of forests of Gujarat. Heading the Forest Department at the Centre, he is credited not only with constituting the Indian Forest service but also introducing the concept of "social forestry" in India, a policy to preserve the greenery of the area, provide firewood, prevent soil erosion as well as consolidation of unmade road shoulders. In India today there is a major wing of the Forest Department focussing on social forestry.

During his tenure as Inspector General of Forests he exhibited a quality of leadership of the highest order. He gave a new orientation to the Forest Department plans by making them industry oriented. He was largely instrumental in the formulation of a very important development scheme, viz., Quick Growing Species. It is under his stewardship that this scheme made very good progress.

He initiated two U.N.D.P. Projects of very great importance for the country.  These projects Were:
1. Pre-investment Survey of Forest Resources and
2. Logging Training Centre Project.

During the operation of the projects, he saw to it that local expertise in the subjects was developed, so that, after expiry of the U.N.D.P. projects they could be continued with local experts. He was largely responsible of the smooth and timely working of the projects according to schedule.

Regarding his role as chairman of the IX Commonwealth Forestry Conference held from 3 to 27 January 1968, Dr. M.R. Jacobs, Director General, Forestry and Timber Bureau, Australia, observed "Shri Hari Singh conducted the conference with dignity, with fairness, with firmness when necessary; above all leading the discussion so that the essential problemsof forestery were constructively considered. There was a time when they thought that the Commonwealth Forestry Conference may have completed its usefulness. Delegates left this conference feeling that there is a definite future for them.  This was the result on the conference due to Shri Hari Singh."

The Government of India nominated Shri Hari Singh on various committees  and commissions. in the international field, he was elected Chairman of the F.A.O. Committee on Range Forest Management, Chairman of the Teak Sub-Commission, Chairman of the Technical Committee on Forestry and Forest PRoducts, 1965; Chairman of the Joint U.N.C.T.A.D./F.A.O. Second Session of the Working Party on Forestry and Timber Products, 1968; Sixth World Forestry Congress, 1966 and Vice-Chairman of the F.A.O. Committee on the Forest Development in Tropics.

After retirement from service, he was appointed as Professor Emeritus of the Forest Research Institute and College for a period of five years. In recognition of his contribution to the field of forestry, the Government of India appointed him as Managing Director of the Newsprint Paper and Pulp Mills, Nepanagar, M.P., India.

References

1910 births
2003 deaths
Indian civil servants